is the founder of Kinomichi and was an uchi-deshi of Morihei Ueshiba, the founder of Aikido.

Formative Years 

Masamichi Noro was born January 21, 1935, in Aomori, Japan. One of the characteristics of his early years is the musical universe that surrounded him, and which strongly influenced his sensibility. His education destined him to be medical doctor, but one encounter re-directed the course of his life toward the martial arts, irrevocably. In 1955, while pursuing university studies, his uncle arranged for him to be presented to a famous master of Ju-jitsu, Morihei Ueshiba, the founder of Aikido. This event proved to be decisive and that same day he decided to renounce his plans in order to become uchi deshi, an internal student of this master. His training, in the ancient manner, took place night and day at the master’s side. In this way, from 1955 to 1961, Masamichi Noro followed Morehei Ueshiba from Tokyo to Iwama where he had his private dojo. At this time, 5 uchi deshi (including Yasuo Kobayashi and Nobuyoshi Tamura) encircled the founder of Aikido, and from this breeding ground sprung the generation which would form a great part of Aïkido worldwide.

The Propagation of Aikido 

In 1961, Morihei Ueshiba wished to send an expert to Europe and entrusted his disciple Masamichi Noro, who by that time had received the 6th dan, the responsibility of supporting the enthusiasm and training of the European and African practitioners. So, he was pushed by Morihei Ueshiba to embark toward the West with the title "Official Delegate for Europe and Africa". It has been noted that from this time, he renounced all dan above the 6th that had been given to him by his master. He followed the sea route of the time, passing the Suez Canal and the Pyramids to land at Marseille on September 3, 1961. The beginning was difficult. The art was new and the way of teaching it very different from the way it was taught in his master’s dojo. Everything had to be constructed, understood and made accessible to the western body and mind. Masamichi Noro deployed his initial energy in southeastern France and in Italy where Judo teachers had invited him to enrich the understanding of their students. The spirit was one of mutual assistance and pleasure in the study, following the wishes of Jigoro Kano, the founder of Judo. Then he was invited to Belgium. He opened his first dojo there. In ploughing these new lands for the budōs he opened more than 200 dojos, as many in Europe as in Africa, flying from Sweden to Senegal. This was a time of pioneers. Mutsuro Nakazono and Nobuyoshi Tamura joined him in 1963 and 1964, respectively. The task was immense, the success exemplary. In 1964, Masamichi Noro established his base in Paris and opened a succession of dojos which left their imprint within the heart of the French aikidokas : at the Gare du Nord, rue de Constance, rue des Petits Hôtels. In the Parisian melting pot, Masamichi Noro met Taisen Deshimaru, Karlfried Graf Dürckheim, Marie-Thérèse Foix, Gisèle de Noiret and Docteur Lily Ehrenfried. He opened himself to new ideas, to original perspectives, to occidental techniques.

The Creation of Kinomichi

The Second Beginning 

In 1979, after a discussion with Kisshomaru Ueshiba, the son of the founder of Aikido, Masamichi Noro created Kinomichi® in order to further extend his quest. There followed a new succession of Parisian dojos dedicated to the study of Kinomichi : rue Logelbach, boulevard de Strasbourg, boulevard des Batignolles. After an inevitable period of adjustments and intense research, the links between Kinomichi® and Aikido developed and deepened.

A Community of Budōs 

1995, at the time of the 20th anniversary of Aikido in Germany and at the invitation of his friend Katsuaki Asai, 8th dan Aïkikaï and pioneer of Aikido in Germany, he presented Kinomichi® before a gathering of the greatest masters of Aikido, including the Doshu. From 1996, he made frequent visits to the Aikikai Foundation in Tokyo and, of course, to Kishomaru Ueshiba, the son of Aikido’s founder. In 2001, he obtained recognition from the ministry of youth and sports (Ministère de la Jeunesse et des Sports) of Kinomichi® as an official sporting discipline. In 2004, he participated in the events celebrating the 20th anniversary of the Fédération française d'aïkido, aïkibudo et affinitaires, FFAAA, which welcomed the Moriteru Ueshiba, representative of the Centre Mondial de l’Aïkido in Tokyo. Masamichi Noro, Nobuyoshi Tamura and Christian Tissier were notably present to receive the delegation from the Hombu Dojo of Tokyo. They were among 3000 practitioners from all of France as well as numerous European countries. April 8, 2005, he was invited with Master Christian Tissier to participate in a workshop organized by the association Hakki for the benefit of the 220,000 victims of the tsunami of December 26, 2004. In 2007, at the initiative of the FFAAA, he welcomed into his Parisian dojo Japanese masters, including Isoyama. March 15, 2013, Noro Masamichi died.

An ever evolving creation 

Since its creation, Kinomichi® has known 3 phases and Masamichi Noro continues to tell his students that his art is ever evolving. The 1980s were characterized by focusing the work on sensitivity, on a correct and relaxed posture, and on the body as an instrument of perception of the self, others and the world. The 90s accented the orientation of the ki and organized the movement to initiate from the ground. 2000 opened onto a period where the technical richness was to be studied in different degrees of speed, difficulty and freedom. Each level is seen not as inferior to the one that follows but like a pathway to that which comes next, like a call to advance. Masamichi Noro accents the heart, shin 心, in particular. To date, he has created access to his art through the work on the breath, ki 気. He demands, at the highest level, that the ki be oriented by the shin, the breath by the heart and that it should be closely bound to technical expertise. Masamichi Noro deploys his energy to create a discipline that opens onto his becoming, following the example of his own master. Morihei Ueshiba never ceased transforming his art, to the point of having given his art 7 different names, like so many milestones along the Way. In this manner, Masamichi Noro takes to heart the etymology of dojo 道場, the house where one studies the Way, Do 道 in Japanese and Tao in Chinese.

Successor and descendants

Following the death of Noro Masamichi sensei, his son Noro Takeharu sensei continues the teaching of Kinomichi according to his father's wish.
In Germany, the Aikido of Asai Katsuaki sensei, 8th dan Aikikai, maintains a strong influence of the art of Noro Masamichi sensei.
Many Aikido experts like to quote Noro Masamichi sensei as their master or one of their masters:
 Michel Bécart senseï 7th dan
 Raymond Bisch senseï 6th dan
 Daniel Martin senseï 6th dan
 Bernard Palmier senseï 7th dan
 Daniel Toutain senseï 6th dan
Nguyen Thanh Thien sensei, a student of Noro Masamichi sensei, has created the Ringenkai Aikido as an offspring Noro Masamichi sensei's teaching.

The KIIA, an independent group, brings together former students of Noro Masamichi sensei (FFAAA technical committee : Christian Bleyer, Jean Pierre Cortier, Lucien Forni, Françoise Paumard, Martine Pillet, Hubert Thomas, Françoise Weidmann). DNBK, Dai Nippon Butoku General Kai Corporation, has certified Noro Masamichi sensei's followers as Shihan Aikido Hanshi :

 Jean Pierre Cortier Sensei, 8th dan
 Lucien Forni Sensei, 8th dan
 Hubert Thomas Sensei, 8th dan

Further reading 
2021 « Le voyage d'un maître, entre Ciel et Terre » book by Nguyen Thanh Thiên, self-edition, 
2012 « Noro Masamichi: The White Tornado » article by Henry Ellis, Aikiweb forum
2006 « Within the spiral of Kinomichi » article by Nguyen Thanh Thiên in Dragon n°16 July/August, French title "Dans la spirale du Kinomichi"
2005 « Une rencontre de l’Aïkido et du Kinomichi » with Masamichi Noro et Christian Tissier, DVD, Gabriel TURKIEH, Production Altomedia.
 2003 « Le mouvement universel du ki » interview of Masamichi Noro in Aikido Magazine December 2003
1996 « Le Kinomichi, du mouvement à la création. Rencontre avec Masamichi Noro. » Raymond Murcia, Editeur Dervy-Livres, Collection Chemins De L'harmonie 
1992 « La pratique du Kinomichi avec maître Noro » Daniel Roumanoff Editeur Criterion Collection L'homme relié 
1960 Photographs of Noro with Ueshiba in Japan and in Europe.

References

External links 
Masamichi Noro ’s Dojo in Paris, teaching by Noro Takeharu sensei
Fédération Française d'Aïkido, Aïkibudo et Affinitaires
Aikido Ringenkai of Nguyen Thanh Thien, offspring of Noro Masamichi senseï's art

1935 births
Japanese aikidoka
2013 deaths